Shanghai is one of the four direct-controlled municipalities of People's Republic of China, and is further divided into 16 districts.  There is no single downtown district in Shanghai as the urban core is scattered across several districts, although Huangpu is generally considered the center of Shanghai.  Today's Huangpu is the result of the mergers of three old districts: the original Huangpu District merged with Nanshi District in 2000, and in 2011 Luwan District also merged into Huangpu.  Huangpu is now the location of the city hall, The Bund, and shopping areas including the famous Nanjing Road, Huaihai Road, and Xintiandi.  Across the Huangpu River, Pudong includes Lujiazui, the financial center of Shanghai as well as China, and has been undergoing rapid development since its formation in 1992.  In April 2009 Nanhui District was merged into Pudong.  Other prominent business and shopping areas include Xujiahui in Xuhui District, Jing'an Temple in Jing'an District, Hongqiao in Changning District, Wujiaochang in Yangpu District, and North Sichuan Road in Hongkou District.  Many universities in Shanghai are located in Yangpu, Minhang, and Songjiang Districts.

Seven of the districts are situated in Puxi (literally Huangpu West), or the older part of urban Shanghai on the west bank of the Huangpu River. These seven districts are collectively referred to as downtown Shanghai or the city centre.The downtown district also includes Pudong New Area.  (Within the outer ring line)

Chongming, Changxing, Hengsha, and Yuansha Islands at the mouth of the Yangtze River are governed by Chongming District.

Administrative divisions
All of these administrative divisions are explained in greater detail at Administrative divisions of the People's Republic of China. This chart lists only county-level divisions of Shanghai.

Further divisions

As of 2009, these administrative divisions are further divided into the following 210 township-level divisions: 109 towns, 2 townships, 99 subdistricts. Those are in turn divided into the following village-level divisions: 3,640 neighborhood committees and 1,722 village committees.

Recent changes in administrative divisions

Historical divisions

Republic of China era (1911–1949)

References

 
Shanghai
Administrative divisions
Districts